Murray Watson Jr. (May 14, 1932 – July 24, 2018) was an American politician. He served as a Democratic member in the Texas House of Representatives from 1957 to 1963 and in the State Senate from 1963 to 1973. As a senator, he introduced legislation that led to the creation of the Texas State Technical College.

References

1932 births
2018 deaths
People from Waco, Texas
Texas lawyers
Democratic Party members of the Texas House of Representatives
Democratic Party Texas state senators
20th-century American lawyers